The province of Udine (Resian:) was a province in the autonomous region Friuli-Venezia Giulia of Italy, bordering Austria and Slovenia. Its capital was the city of Udine, which had a population of 99,242 inhabitants. It was abolished on 30 September 2017.

History
Not much information is known about Udine prior to its ownership by the episcopal see the Patriarchate of Aquileia in 983. The Patriarchate of Aquileia did not reside in Udine until after the 13th century, when they began by living in the castle of Udine, followed by its archiepiscopal palace. In 1350, Austria intervened in the region and caused a number of factional problems for residents. It was annexed by Venice in 1420 and control over Udine was granted to Tristano Savorgnan, the leader of a family in the city. His family had mostly been executed for opposing the Austrians and were allied with Venice.

Under the rule of Venice and the family of Savorgnan, Udine fell into decline due to neglect, although it continued to be ruled by Venice until the French forces of Napoleon conquered the region. Following this, Austria gained control over Udine in 1814 but this was not received well by residents; they announced independence from Austria in 1848 that resulted in the Austrians bombarding the city with its artillery. The unification of Italy in 1866 prevented any further Austrian rule. In World War I, Udine was the main base for the forces of Italy until Austria occupied the city in October 1917; it was liberated by Italy in November 1918.

Geography
The province of Udine is the largest and most populous of the four provinces in the autonomous region of Friuli-Venezia Giulia in northeastern Italy. To the north is the international border with Austria and Slovenia. To the west lies the Province of Pordenone, which was subdivided from Udine in 1968. To the southwest lies the Province of Venice and to the east, the Province of Trieste. The south of the province has a coastline on the Adriatic Sea. The province is located in the lowlands of the Po-Venetian Valley, south of the Venetian Prealps and the Alpine foothills of Friuli. The provincial capital is the city of Udine.

The northerly part of the province is mountainous with pine forests, upland pastures and mountain lakes. The hilly area in the centre is characterised by vineyards which produces the wines of the region, including an internationally famous white wine. The southwesterly part of the province is flat, low-lying land farmed and irrigated intensively, and the coast has beaches, sand dunes and lagoons. To the southeast, the land is higher where the limestone Karst Plateau reaches the Adriatic, and there are cliffs on the coast. A number of rivers cross the province, rising in the Alps and flowing south to the Adriatic. Foremost of these is the Tagliamento which forms the western boundary of the province. The soil is porous and much of the water from the mountains flows underground to resurface as a zone of springs on the plain.

Government and politics

See also 
 Venetian Slovenia

References

External links
 Official website 

 
Udine